Frizzled-3 (Fz-3) is a protein that in humans is encoded by the FZD3 gene.

Function 

This gene is a member of the frizzled gene family. Members of this family encode seven-transmembrane domain proteins that are receptors for the Wingless type MMTV integration site family of signaling proteins. Most frizzled receptors are coupled to the beta-catenin canonical signaling pathway.  It may play a role in mammalian hair follicle development.

The function of this gene is largely derived from mouse studies. Fzd3 in the mouse functions through planar cell polarity signaling instead of the canonical Wnt/beta-catenin pathway. Fzd3 controls axon growth and guidance in the mouse nervous system, and migration of neural crest cells.

See also
 Frizzled

References

Further reading

External links

G protein-coupled receptors